Hardwired is a 1986 cyberpunk science fiction novel by American writer Walter Jon Williams.

It was nominated for the 1987 Locus Award.

Plot summary
The Orbital Corporations won the Rock War, and now they control America. Cowboy, one of the protagonists, is a smuggler who can control an armored hovertank using a neural interface. The other protagonist, Sarah, is a prostitute turned mercenary assassin; she and Cowboy end up teaming up to fight the Orbitals.

Ex-fighter pilot Cowboy, "hardwired" via skull sockets directly to his lethal electronic hardware, teams up with Sarah, an equally cyborized gun-for-hire, to make a last stab at independence. Cowboy is hired by a Russian named Arkady to transport medicine across "The Line" while Sarah takes a seduction and assassination job for an Orbital agent named Cunningham. Both of them find themselves betrayed by their employers and soon are forced into hiding, driving them together. 

Romance blooms between the two as Cowboy makes arrangements with an old colleague named Reno to try to take off some of their cargo to give them spending money. Reno is promptly assassinated by the Orbitals, making their situation worse. Cowboy decides to try to strike at the corporation behind their troubles, Temple Pharmaceuticals, while Sarah decides to make a second deal with them. 

Sarah finds her hospitalized brother, Daud, has been seduced by an agent of the Orbitals and is feeding them information by them. Sarah attempts to betray Cowboy and his people but has a last minute change of heart that results in her being barely able to escape with the help of Reno, the deceased smuggler surviving inside the internet as an AI. Reno is seeking Black Mind technology that will allow him to overwrite the mind of a cybernetically enhanced mind to live again. It was created as a weapon against the Orbitals but never deployed.

Cowboy and a monstrous TP executive, Roon, inflict immense damage on the company's finances via stock manipulation but can't do enough to overthrow its current leader, Couceiro. Cowboy sets up a last ditch plan to shoot down a space ship carrying medical supplies that will restore TP's stock value. Daud betrays their location to the Orbitals and most of Cowboy's people are killed. Cowboy manages to shoot down the ship while Cunningham commits suicide after his mercenaries are killed. Cowboy manages to survive, though, and Roon takes over as CEO of TP with Couceiro "banished" to Earth.

Roon attempts to blackmail Sarah and Cowboy into working for him but is then killed by Reno, who overwrites his consciousness and replaces him. Sarah and Cowboy are left with no enemies and a very powerful new friend.

Series
HardWired is part of a series which includes:
Hardwired (1986)
Voice of the Whirlwind (1987)
Solip:System (1989)

In other media
R. Talsorian Games, with Williams' assistance, published Hardwired: The Sourcebook for their Cyberpunk role-playing game, which further expanded many of the concepts and the world setting of the novel. Williams had a previous relationship with creator Mike Pondsmith and R. Talsorian Games, playtesting the original Cyberpunk game system.

See also

Damnation Alley, a novel by Roger Zelazny which Williams stated was an inspiration for his novel.

References

External links

1986 American novels
1986 science fiction novels
Cyberpunk novels
Night Shade Books books